Eccleston Square Hotel is an independently owned boutique hotel located in Pimlico, London. It has been referred to as Europe's most high-tech hotel by Condé Nast Traveler and featured as one of Five Hotels With Top-Notch Technology by Forbes.

History

Eccleston Square Hotel is a grade II listed building and was renovated over a period of 1 year at a cost of £6.5 million.  The architectural and interior design work for the project was performed by Woods Bagot and opened in August 2011. The hotel is operated by Olivia Byrne and her brother James Byrne and is a member of Design Hotels.

Six months after opening, Eccleston won the 2011 In-Room Technology Innovation award at the European Hospitality Awards.

Features and media reception

Features of the hotel include fiber optic Wi-Fi, VOIP telephony, Sky 3D, 3D DVD library, Blu-ray DVD Library, Nespresso coffee facilities, Hästens Massage Beds, iPod docking station,  and 46" Panasonic flat-screen televisions.  Eccleston also have shower glass that can turn from transparent to frosted by flipping a switch. Additional bathroom features include heated floors. 

In 2013, the Toronto Star listed Eccleston as a "hotel for health-minded travelers" based on the sleep-induced sounds and images that are broadcast in each room which are designed to promote better sleep.

References

Hotels in London